Louisville Chorus, established 1939 in Louisville, Kentucky, is the longest-thriving most frequently performing choral arts agency in Kentuckiana and neighboring states—also exceeding the longevity of opera, ballet, and theatre in the area.

Louisville Chorus has filmed concerts for international broadcast on EWTN, the largest religious media network in the world and has recorded music for Hollywood in the making of movies. Louisville Chorus is  also a member of Chorus America and has had music chosen for nationwide broadcast on the first nationally distributed radio series to focus exclusively on the art of choral music performance.

A professional chorus of auditioned singers, Louisville Chorus provides an immense repertoire ranging from choral masterworks with orchestra to pops, family-oriented, Broadway, and celebrations of Christmas, Valentine’s Day, Fourth of July, and more. This chorus offers a very active season of concerts, multimedia events, and outreach programs. It performs with other arts agencies including adult and youth ensembles, and offers concerts for arts series and other events throughout Kentuckiana.

The Kentucky Arts Council, the state arts agency, provides partial operating support to Louisville Chorus with state tax dollars and federal funding from the National Endowment for the Arts.

Louisville Chorus is supported by the Louisville Fund for the Arts.

History

In 1939, Father Joseph Emrich founded The Holy Name Choral Club, which later became The Choral Club of Louisville in 1972 and Louisville Chorus in 1987. The late Joseph Herde succeeded Father Emrich. Richard Spalding, Conductor Emeritus, devoted 20 years to this choral arts agency and made possible its 1985 European Sister Cities Concert Tour. From 1991-2002, Music Director Daniel Spurlock ushered this ensemble and its audiences into a wide variety of experiences. In January, 2003, Louisville Chorus was pleased to welcome S. Timothy Glasscock as Artistic Director. Therese Davis, Executive Director and Pianist, has collaborated with the music directors since 1969 to ensure high standards and the successful growth and development of the Chorus. In June 2009 Daniel Spurlock returned as our Louisville Chorus Music Director.

Highlights

Ongoing Annual Events:  MasterWorks with orchestra • Performance collaborations with other arts institutions, including the youth • Local and Outreach Concerts • Celebrations of Christmas, Valentine's Day, Fourth of July, and more • Active season of concerts, incorporating widely diversified repertoire and performance venues

2018    Implementation of Apprentice Connection program—for HS singers—To rehearse & perform in a professional choral ensemble environment and to apply & build upon education gained from current HS choral director

2016    Performance of the Dan Forrest (Young/Living/Contemporary composer) Requiem for the Living (His largest work—Published in 2013) joined by Louisville Philharmonia—the Musicians' Orchestra, chorus and soloists

2009    6/09—Return of Daniel Spurlock as Music Director

2009    Filming for perpetual INTERNATIONAL Broadcast on EWTN, largest global religious media network

2006    Collaborative performances of A German Requiem (Brahms) with Jewish Community Center Orchestra and YPAS Concert Choir

2003    Appointment of S. Timothy Glasscock as Artistic Director

2002    A 9/11 Memorial Musical Tribute

2000    Feature concert - Mozart Requiem + with members of The Louisville Orchestra

1999    Season opening performance of the Fauré Requiem with The Louisville Orchestra

1997    Iroquois Amphitheater Diamond Jubilee Season Opener and subsequent Kickoff Concerts

1996    Release of first CD Christmas from the Heart

1995    First annual Unforgettable Valentine Dinner Concert

1994    Host Chorus for Symphony No. 8 (Mahler) "Symphony of A Thousand" with The Louisville Orchestra; Daniel Spurlock, Chorus Master

1993    Lonesome Pine Special Celebration of Irish Folk Music Concert with Mick Moloney

1992    "My Old Kentucky Home", sung in Russian, to 300 million former Soviet citizens, during a Kentucky Derby telecast

1992    Host Chorus for the Kentucky Bicentennial Concert

1991    Appointment of Daniel Spurlock as Music Director

1989    Designation of Richard Spalding as Conductor Emeritus

1988    First Super Pops with The Louisville Orchestra; Initial induction into Chorus America, the National Association for Professional Vocal Ensembles

1987    Name change to The Louisville Chorus; "Resurrection" Symphony No. 2 (Mahler) with The Louisville Orchestra

1985    European Sister Cities Concert Tour to Mainz, Germany and Montpellier, France; Carmina Burana with the Louisville Ballet

1984    Official Brown & Williamson sponsored "Light Up Louisville" Entertainment for the next 10 years

1982    Benefit Concert for Hearing Impaired Children

1972    Name change to The Choral Club of Louisville.  Chorus becomes non-denominational.

1970    Verdi Requiem with The Louisville Orchestra

1967    Appointment of Richard Spalding as Music Director (20 year tenure)

1958    Appointment of Joseph Herde as Music Director

1942    Recruitment of Catholic women.  Began Iroquois Amphitheater performances with proceeds to the U.S.O.

1940    First performance in Columbia Auditorium (Knights of Columbus - now Spalding Auditorium)

1939    Founding of the Holy Name Band and Choral Club (all Catholic men) by Father Joseph Emrich

See also
 List of attractions and events in the Louisville metropolitan area

External links
 Louisville Chorus website
 Louisville Chorus YouTube Channel
 Louisville Chorus—The Power of Music
 Louisville Chorus Impressions
 Listen to Louisville Chorus
 Louisville Chorus CDs
 Louisville Chorus Mission/Reviews
 Louisville Chorus Begins its Christmas Concert Series in Style on Louisville.com
 All Voices: Local to Global News - A review of a Louisville Chorus Concert
 KET reviews Daniel Spurlock, Music Director of The Louisville Chorus
 Performing Arts Directory listing
 YELP reference
 Louisville Chorus at the Cathedral of the Assumption

Arts organizations based in Louisville, Kentucky
Choirs in Louisville, Kentucky
Musical groups established in 1939
1939 establishments in Kentucky